Danwake, also known as bean dumpling, is a dish of boiled cowpea flour dumplings from the northern part of Nigeria.  It has little flavor of its own, and is usually garnished with sauce, egg, vegetables, or chili pepper.

Origin 
Dan wake originated in Niger, and has since spread to the Hausa-speaking area of northern Nigeria.

Overview 
Danwake is prepared by mixing ground cowpeas, kuku (baobab powder) and potash with water to form a thick paste, which is formed into dumplings and boiled.  The dumplings are typically garnished with fried vegetables, oil, Maggi sauce, boiled egg, yaji (cayenne pepper), or suya pepper.

See also 
 Hausa cuisine

References 

Nigerian cuisine
Legume dishes
Hausa cuisine